Tomb of Mir Madan is located at Faridpur, in the Beldanga II CD block in the Berhampore subdivision of Murshidabad district.

According to the List of Monuments of National Importance in West Bengal, the Tomb of Mir Madan is an ASI Listed Monument.

Geography

Location

Note: The map alongside presents some of the notable locations in the subdivisions. All places marked in the map are linked in the larger full screen map.

Mir Madan
Mir Madan was one of the most trusted officers and chief of the artillery of Nawab Siraj Ud Dowla. On 23 June 1757, in the Battle of Plassey, Mir Madan fought for the Nawab whereas Commander-in-chief Mir Jafar and others remained standstill. Madan's troops caused a serious pressure on the forces of the East India Company. At 2 pm on that day, he was mortally wounded by a British cannonball and died. His two fellow fighters, Nawe Singh Hajari and Bahadur Khan, also died.

Some cadres of his troop buried him secretly in Faridpur village, Murshidabad district (P.S. Rejinagar) near the Palashi battlefield. This place is known as Farid Shah's Dargah (Mosque).

Gallery

References

External links
 

Tourist attractions in Murshidabad
Buildings and structures in Murshidabad district
Monuments of National Importance in West Bengal